Yuan Weiyi (born 5 August 2000) is a Chinese para swimmer.

Yuan competed in his first Paralympic games at the 2020 Tokyo Paralympics, where he won the gold medal in the mixed 4 × 50 metre freestyle relay 20pts and the bronze medal at the men's 50 metre butterfly S5.

References

2000 births
Living people
People from Cixi
Sportspeople from Ningbo
Paralympic gold medalists for China
Paralympic silver medalists for China
Paralympic bronze medalists for China
Paralympic swimmers of China
Chinese male freestyle swimmers
Swimmers at the 2020 Summer Paralympics
Medalists at the 2020 Summer Paralympics
S5-classified Paralympic swimmers
Paralympic medalists in swimming
Chinese amputees
Chinese male butterfly swimmers
21st-century Chinese people